John Smits (born September 7, 1988) is a Canadian soccer player and coach.

Career
After playing for the University of Toronto from 2009 through 2011, Smits signed with FC Edmonton of the NASL in 2012. Smits made his professional debut against the Atlanta Silverbacks in May 2012, posting a shutout. In the 2014 NASL season, Smits took over the starting goalkeeper role with FC Edmonton. Smits won the 2014 NASL Golden Glove award for lowest goals against average that season.

In 2015, Smits was loaned to the Montreal Impact during the 2014–15 CONCACAF Champions League final, although he did not suit up. Smits was released by the club on October 28, 2015 

Smits signed with Wilmington Hammerheads of the USL on February 25, 2016 He made his club debut in Wilmington's 2016 season opener in a 2-1 win against Orlando City B on March 26, 2016. Smits would only spend one season in Wilmington, as the club announced that they would not participate in the 2017 USL season.

In April 2022, he played a single game against FC London for Unionville Milliken SC in League1 Ontario. In May 2022, he made a lone appearance for Canadian Soccer League side Serbian White Eagles FC but broke his foot in the match and had to be substituted.

Coaching
In July 2017, Smits returned to his college team, the Toronto Varsity Blues, as goalkeeper coach.

Club
Statistics accurate as of May 1, 2022

References

1988 births
Living people
Canadian soccer players
Canadian expatriate soccer players
FC Edmonton players
CF Montréal players
North American Soccer League players
Soccer players from Mississauga
Toronto Varsity Blues soccer players
USL Championship players
Wilmington Hammerheads FC players
Association football goalkeepers
Canadian expatriate sportspeople in the United States
Expatriate soccer players in the United States
Unionville Milliken SC players
Serbian White Eagles FC players
Canadian Soccer League (1998–present) players